Skyttea is a genus of lichenicolous (lichen-dwelling) fungi in the family Cordieritidaceae. The genus was circumscribed in 1981 by lichenologists Martha Allen Sherwood, David L. Hawksworth, and Brian J. Coppins, with Skyttea nitschkei assigned as the type species.

The genus name Skyttea honours Mogens Skytte Christiansen (1918–1996), a Danish botanist (interested in microbiology, mycology and lichenology), and also a botanical illustrator.

Species
Skyttea anziae 
Skyttea arenicola 
Skyttea buelliae 
Skyttea bumyoungsungii 
Skyttea caesii 
Skyttea carboneae 
Skyttea cismonicae 
Skyttea dacampiae 
Skyttea elachistophora 
Skyttea fusispora 
Skyttea gossypina 
Skyttea graphidicola 
Skyttea gregaria 
Skyttea hawksworthii 
Skyttea heterochroae 
Skyttea insignis 
Skyttea lecanorae 
Skyttea mayrhoferi 
Skyttea megalosporae 
Skyttea nitschkei 
Skyttea ochrolechiae 
Skyttea pertusariicola 
Skyttea pyrenulae 
Skyttea radiatilis 
Skyttea recognita 
Skyttea richardsonii 
Skyttea spinosa 
Skyttea tavaresae 
Skyttea thelotrematis 
Skyttea violacea 
Skyttea viridis

References

Leotiomycetes
Leotiomycetes genera
Taxa described in 1981
Taxa named by David Leslie Hawksworth
Taxa named by Brian John Coppins